Mr Speaker (foaled  May 14, 2011) is an American Thoroughbred racehorse and the winner of the 2011 Belmont Derby.

Career
Mr Speakers's first race was on August 24, 2013, at Saratoga, where he came in 6th. He had his first win, after three races, on October 14, 2013, at Belmont Park.

On December 21, 2013, he had his first stakes win at the Grade-3 Dania Beach Stakes. He came into the race at 10:1 odds and defeated Cabo Cat for the victory. He finished the 2013 season with this win.

To start the 2014 season, he came in a disappointing 7th at the Grade-2 Holy Bull Stakes and 2nd at the Grade-3 Palm Beach Stakes.

He had his first win of the 2014 season when he won the Grade-3 Lexington Stakes on April 19, 2014. He defeated Divine Oath by four lengths at 2:1 odds as the favorite.

On May 26, 2014, he came in a disappointing 5th place finish at the Penning Ridge Stakes. This loss was overshadowed as, on July 5, 2014, he won the Grade-1 Belmont Derby. He came into the race at 23:1 odds, the second to worst odds in the field. The win gained his owners a $1,250,000 million dollar purse after he edged Adelaide near the finish.

The Belmont Derby win was his last win for over a year until he won a much less impressive Allowance Optional Claiming race at Woodbine on July 15, 2015.

He came in 4th at the August 16, 2015, Grade-2 Sky Classic Stakes and had the final win of his career on September 19, 2015, at the Commonwealth Turf Cup. He defeated Cut to Order and Legendary as the race favorite at 2:1 odds.

He finished his career on November 14, 2015, after a 5th place finish at the Red Smith Stakes. He was officially retired in late November 2015.

Pedigree

References

2011 racehorse births